Benzimidazolines are a family of heterocyclic compounds, based on a benzene ring fused with an imidazoline. The parent compound has the chemical formula C7H8N2.

References 

Benzimidazolines